The Platform is an online radio station founded by former MagicTalk broadcaster Sean Plunket in September 2021 with the goal of promoting free speech, democracy and debate. The radio station is owned by both the Wright family and Plunket. Notable hosts have included Plunket, sports broadcaster Martin Devlin, former Otago Regional Council member Michael Laws, and former ACT Party leader Rodney Hide.

Content and hosts
The Platform describes itself as an "independent media site" giving listeners "unbiased coverage commentary and opinion and the chance to have your say on the issues that affect you." The station claims to be independent of government funding and political interference. The Platform promotes itself as an alternative to "taxpayer-funded media" and so-called "woke culture warriors" whom it accuses of seeking to "stifle debate and suffocate democracy. It is listed on the New Zealand Companies Office's website as a recorded media and publishing company based in the Wellington suburb of Te Aro.

The Platform hosts have included founder and veteran broadcaster Sean Plunket, former Newstalk ZB sports broadcaster Martin Devlin, former National Party Member of Parliament (MP) and Otago Regional Council member Michael Laws, and former ACT Party leader Rodney Hide. As of February 2022, Plunket hosted the breakfast slot from 6am to 9am; Laws hosted the 9am to 12pm slot, Leanne Malcolm  hosted the 12pm to 3pm slot, and Devlin hosted the 3pm to 6pm slot. In addition, former National Party press secretary Ani O'Brien served as The Platform digital engagement editor until a workplace dispute with Plunket.

Notable guests have included left-wing columnist Chris Trotter, left-wing blogger Martyn "Bomber" Bradbury, former National Party leader Don Brash, former Dominion Post editor Karl du Fresne, ACT Party leader David Seymour, New Zealand First leader Winston Peters, Labour Party Member of Parliament (MP) and cabinet minister Chris Hipkins, former Labour MP Michael Bassett, Counterspin Media founder and right-wing activist Kelvyn Alp, Voices for Freedom spokesperson Alia Brand, anti-vaccine influencer Chantelle Baker, former All Blacks coach Steve Hansen, and Team New Zealand sailor Grant Dalton.

According to Plunket, The Platform content consisted of 12 hours of live talkback radio including Plunket's show Plunket Unchained, hourly news bulletins, regular headlines, and talkback calls. Other content has included podcasts that were sourced internally and externally as well as op-ed columns. In addition to its website, The Platform is available as a mobile app on both iOS and Android operating systems. Since The Platform operates exclusively in the digital media sphere, the national broadcasting regulator Broadcasting Standards Authority (BSA) has no jurisdiction over its activities.

Funding and ownership
Per Plunket's policy, The Platform does not receive public funding such as the Government's Public Interest Journalism Fund due to its requirement for recipients to adhere to the principles of the Treaty of Waitangi, which he regarded as a limitation on free speech. The Platform is instead funded by the Tauranga-based Wright family, who own the preschool provider BestStart, which has 270 branches across New Zealand. The Wrights own 75% of the station's shares while Plunket owns the remaining 25%.

History

Origins and launch
In September 2021, veteran broadcaster Sean Plunket announced that he would start his own online talkback radio station called The Platform, which he said would promote free speech, democracy and debate. Plunket had previously served as a host on the talkback radio station Magic Talk until February 2021. In December 2020, the BSA had reprimanded and fined Magic Talk's parent company Media Works New Zealand the sum of NZ$3,000 for what it described as an "offensive and harmful interview"  between Plunket and a Te Whānau ā Apanui spokesperson regarding roadblocks in the Northland Region during the COVID-19 pandemic in New Zealand.

In early February 2022, Plunket confirmed that former Newstalk ZB sports broadcaster Martin Devlin, former National Paty MP Michael Laws, and Leanne Malcolm would be joining The Platform as hosts. During an interview with The Spinoff managing editor Duncan Greive, Plunket said that The Platform would feature talkback, podcasts and opinion. While Plunket did not confirm a launch date for the media outlet, he stated that he would be "soft launching" the website and app between March and April 2022.  Plunket and his co-hosts were also joined by digital engagement editor Ani O'Brien, who had previously served as press secretary to former National Party leader Judith Collins.

Plunket initially published The Platform as a website carrying interviews and opinion pieces by staff writers and guests. By mid-May 2022, the station had established two studios in Wellington and Central Otago and was broadcasting online 11 hours daily. By September 2022, majority shareholder Wayne Wright claimed that the radio station had attracted a million views a month across its various platforms.

2022 Wellington Parliament protest
In mid February 2022, The Platform published the results of David Farrar's Curia Market Research survey on the composition of protesters who took part in the 2022 Wellington protest which occupied the grounds of the New Zealand Parliament. This survey looked at the hometowns, gender, ethnicity, voting patterns, vaccination status, and motivations of the protesters. Farrar's survey found that 76.9% of protesters were unvaccinated; 4.8% had received one shot; 13.8% had received a double shot; and that 2.9% had been triple boosted. The survey also found that most protesters were motivated by opposition to vaccine mandates,  freedom of choice, concerns about children being vaccinated, and the loss of jobs resulting from vaccine mandates.

In response to the release of Stuff's Circuit documentary Fire and Fury which looked at the groups and figures who led the 2022 Wellington protest, The Platform hosted several of these figures and groups including Chantelle Baker, Kelvyn Alp and Voices for Freedom. Since the producers of Fire and Fury including Stuff journalist Paula Penfold had declined to interview these figures and groups to avoid "platforming" them and their views, The Platform hosted them in order to enable them to "give their side of the story" and respond to the documentary. These interviews were widely circulated on various social media platforms. In response, Penfold likened Platform founder Plunket to American right-wing broadcaster and conspiracy theorist Alex Jones. She claimed that Plunket's decision to host these individuals and groups stripped The Platform of "journalist credibility" and alleged that he incited hatred against mainstream journalists.

O'Brien employment dispute
In mid-February 2023, the Employment Relations Authority (ERA) heard an employment dispute between Plunket and former Platform digital engagement editor Ani O'Brien. She testified that Plunket had acted aggressively on three occasions between May and June 2022, causing her mental health to deteriorate. While Plunket denied that he had an aggressive demeanour at work, he acknowledged that he had acted "appallingly" in times of "high stress." He also admitted that he lacked experience in managing multiple staff but had since received business and management guidance from Wayne Wright. However, Plunket disputed O'Brien's claims that he had created an unsafe work environment and accused her of undermining his leadership. Both Plunket and O'Brien are expected to make submissions to ERA at a later date, with the Authority expected to make a determination after that.

Notes and references

Further reading

External links

2021 establishments in New Zealand
Internet radio in New Zealand
Internet properties established in 2021
Mass media companies of New Zealand
New Zealand news websites
New Zealand political websites
Radio stations established in 2021